Tatayurt (Tota-yurt) is a rural locality (a selo) in Tamazatyubinsky Selsoviet, Babayurtovsky District, Republic of Dagestan, Russia. The population was 2,366 as of 2010. There are 24 streets.

Geography 
Tatayurt is located 20 km southeast of Babayurt (the district's administrative centre) by road. Tsadakh is the nearest rural locality.

References 

Rural localities in Babayurtovsky District